Eva Grimaldi (born Milva Perinoni, 7 September 1961) is an Italian actress and model.

Biography 

Born in Nogarole Rocca, Grimaldi debuted as a nude model in Playmen and as a soubrette in the Antonio Ricci's TV-show Drive In.  She made her film debut in Federico Fellini's Intervista, and starred in Giuliano Carnimeo's cult horror film Ratman and Marina Ripa Di Meana's Cattive ragazze. From then, she appeared in numerous films and TV-series, including works by Mario Monicelli, Dino Risi, Damiano Damiani, Claude Chabrol, Jean-Marie Poiré and John Irvin. She was also very active on stage, working mainly with Pier Francesco Pingitore.

Personal life 
In 2020 she revealed that her relationship with the actor Gabriel Garko was created at the table.
She married in 2019 politician and activist Imma Battaglia.

References

External links 
 

1961 births
Living people
Italian film actresses
Italian television personalities
Actors from Verona
Italian television actresses
Italian stage actresses
Italian female models
20th-century Italian actresses
Mass media people from Verona
Italian LGBT rights activists
Italian lesbian actresses